Horizon High School is a public school in Horizon City, Texas (United States). It is part of the Clint Independent School District.

History
Horizon High School is Located in Horizon City, Texas. The school first opened its doors as Horizon Middle School, In its first year 2002-2003. The campus served as a middle school with grades 7, 8, and 9. In the years 2003-2004, grade 10 was added to the school, becoming Horizon Middle/High School. Horizon gradually started becoming a high school by the year 2005-2006, when Horizon Middle School moved to its own location and now is serving students in grades 9-12 having the Class of 2006 as its first senior graduating class. On June 1, 2007, Horizon High School had its second senior graduating class, the class of 2007. Horizon High School offers instructional strands in Telecommunications, Global Marketing, Banking, and Investments. The school has an El Paso Area Teachers Federal Credit Union housed inside the school and the plan is to offer internships and mentorships to the students. It has an estimated student enrollment of 1,274. Horizon High School's mascot is the scorpion.

Horizon High School was run with controversy after students from school were found smuggling drugs between Ciudad Juarez, Chihuahua, Mexico, and Oklahoma City, Oklahoma. On August 9, 2007, U.S. Immigration and Custom Enforcement agents arrested 18-year-old at the time Horizon High School graduate Rene Humberto “Jetta” Perez for smuggling drugs between Mexico and Oklahoma City, OK. He was charged with conspiring to import about 1,000 kilos of marijuana and was sentenced to serve in prison. A federal magistrate set bond at $20,000. The Clint Independent School District was forced to install security camera system to detect any drug-related activity around the school. On July 23, 2007, former student Ivan Lozoya informed law enforcement that Perez was responsible for the recruitment of several students to smuggle the drugs, which were then transported to drug lord known as “El Tio” in Oklahoma City. This investigation took months, when other students were captured for smuggling drugs into the U.S.; all accused Perez and Lozoya as recruiters of drug smuggling.

On August 30, 2012, Horizon City police went into Horizon High School and took photographs of students' tattoos, saying it was for gang activity information. One of the students' parents was extremely upset due to the photographs being taken of her son's tattoos because she said it humiliated him and put her son's life in danger. Police Chief Michael McConnel stated he was not aware of the operation and that the photographs were destroyed, as he felt those police officers did not handle the situation appropriately.

Extracurricular activities
Horizon High School provides academic extra-curricular activities to its students. The school has achieved successful accomplishments with its competitive academic performances from marching band, jazz band, dance, flags, One Act Play and JROTC as well as the other extra-curricular activities offered. Students have the opportunity to experience competitive and positive learning from all the extra-curricular activities at Horizon High school.
Cosmetology
Student Council
Marching Band
Jazz Band
Flag Team
Spanish Club
Dance
Yearbook
One Act Play
JROTC
National Honor Society
Spanish Honor Society
Criminal Justice Club

Sports
Horizon High School is a member of the Texas University Interscholastic League, or UIL. Currently, Horizon is in District 2-5A. With very slow starts but becoming one of the strongest teams in Football and Basketball, the Scorpions are looking forward to becoming some of the cities' best athletes. Horizon High School does have one strong point in sports, its cross country team. Both boys and girls team being ranked very high in the cities standings. With the Boys having their first 2-4A District Title in 2005, which led to a Regional title as well.

Boys

Football
Basketball
Baseball
Tennis
Track & Field
Cross Country
Golf
Soccer
Wrestling

Girls

Cheerleading
Volleyball
Basketball
Softball
Tennis
Track & Field
Cross Country
Wrestling

References

External links
 
 Clint ISD

Clint Independent School District high schools
2002 establishments in Texas
Educational institutions established in 2002
Public high schools in Texas